Barellan Point is a rural residential suburb in the City of Ipswich, Queensland, Australia. In the  Barellan Point had a population of 1,159 people.

Geography 
The suburb is bounded by the Brisbane River to the east and the Bremer River to the south. It includes two uninhabited islands in the Brisbane River:

 Bedwell Island,  island
 Finlay Island,  island but Findlay Island is now effectively attached to the mainland of Barellan Point

History

In February 1864 John Petrie appointed Irish engineer Joseph Brady to provide advice and designs for the navigational improvements on the Brisbane and Bremer Rivers between Brisbane and Ipswich. This includes the construction of a training wall at the south-eastern corner of Barrelan Point where the Bremer River flows into the Brisbane River to flow the channel to avoid the built-up of sandbanks.

During World War II, the Barellan Point Landing Ground was built on an elevated level site by RAAF Base Amberley. It was also known as the Bremer River Landing Ground and Riverview Landing Ground. Originally built for emergency landings, it was also used by RAAF No 23 Squadron as a training airfield and for their Moth Minor A21-7 operations. After the war ended, the land reverted to its former use as farm land. A memorial and information board at the corner of Fifth Avenue and Junction Road commemorate the landing ground. The memorial was officially unveiled on Friday 26 June 2015 by the Queensland Governor Paul de Jersey.

On 12 July 1988 the Moreton Shire Council officially opened Joseph Brady Park to commemorate Joseph Brady's engineering achievements at the site of one of his projects. It was a project undertaken as part of the Australian Bicentenary.

At the  Barellan Point  had a population of 1,178 people.

In the  Barellan Point had a population of 1,159 people.

Amenities 

There are a number of parks in the area:

 Faulkner Crescent Reserve

 Findlay Park

 Hallett Park

 Joseph Brady Park at the confluence of the two rivers

 Mitchell Street Reserve

 Riverside Avenue Reserve (1260a)

 Springdale Park

 Third Avenue Reserve

References

Suburbs of Ipswich, Queensland